Acharya Giriraj Kishore (4 February 1920 – 13 July 2014) was an Indian activist representing Hindu nationalism. He served as senior vice-president of Vishwa Hindu Parishad, the religious wing of the Hindu nationalist Sangh Parivar.

life
Kishore was from Etah Village Misauli near Jalesar. He had done his master's degree in Hindi literature, history and political science.
As a school teacher in the town of Morena, he caught the attention of Vijayaraje Scindia, a prominent leader of the Bharatiya Janata Party from the region. Mrs. Scindia, whose sympathies lay with VHP, gave him a start in the organisation during the Ram Janmabhoomi agitation, with which he came to be closely associated. He acted as joint general secretary, general secretary and senior vice president of the International wing  of the Vishva Hindu Parishad.

Activism
On October 16 in Jhajjar district, Haryana, five Dalit youths were lynched by a mob, reportedly led by members of the VHP in the presence of local police officials, following false rumors that the Dalits had killed a cow. Nearly a month later five people were arrested, prompting a backlash by villagers who pelted police with stones and blocked off roads for nearly a week. The local leader of the VHP, Acharya Giriraj Kishore, said he had no regrets over the incident and that the life of a cow was worth more than that of five Dalits.

Kishore died on 13 July 2014 at RK Puram, New Delhi. He donated his body to Medical college for social cause.

References

External links
 

1920 births
2014 deaths
Indian Hindus
Vishva Hindu Parishad members
Rashtriya Swayamsevak Sangh pracharaks
Recipients of the Padma Shri in literature & education